Hasanpur Assembly constituency may refer to 
 Hasanpur, Bihar Assembly constituency
 Hasanpur, Uttar Pradesh Assembly constituency